Dupouyichthys sapito is the only species of banjo catfishes in the genus Dupouyichthys. This species appears to be restricted to the Magdalena and Maracaibo basins. D. sapito is a small, armored aspredinid, growing up to 27 millimetres (1.1 in) SL, distinguished from all other aspredinids by having only one set of paired pre-anal-fin plates. Also, the bony ornamentation of its skull is better developed than its close relatives. It is found in river banks with vegetation.

References

External links

Aspredinidae
Catfish of South America
Freshwater fish of Colombia
Magdalena River
Fish of Venezuela
Fish described in 1944
Taxa named by Leonard Peter Schultz